The Suez inscriptions of Darius the Great were texts written in Old Persian, Elamite, Babylonian and Egyptian on five monuments erected in Wadi Tumilat, commemorating the opening of the "Canal of the Pharaohs", between the Nile and the Bitter Lakes.

One of the best preserved of these monuments was a stele of pink granite, which was discovered by Charles de Lesseps, Ferdinand de Lesseps's son, in 1866, 30 kilometers from Suez near Kabret in Egypt. It was erected by Darius the Great, king of the Achaemenid Empire (or Persia), whose reign lasted from 522 to 486 BCE. The monument, also known as the Chalouf stele (alt. Shaluf Stele), records the construction of a forerunner of the modern Suez Canal by the Persians, a canal through Wadi Tumilat, connecting the easternmost, Bubastite, branch of the Nile with Lake Timsah which was connected to the Red Sea by natural waterways. The stated purpose of the canal was the creation of a shipping connection between the Nile and the Red Sea, between Egypt and Persia.

Text
Partial transliteration and translation of the inscription:
 Transliteration of the Old Persian text:

English translation:

"King Darius says: I am a Persian; setting out from Persia I conquered Egypt. I ordered to dig this canal from the river that is called Nile and flows in Egypt, to the sea that begins in Persia. Therefore, when this canal had been dug as I had ordered, ships went from Egypt through this canal to Persia, as I had intended."

See also
 History of Achaemenid Egypt
 List of Iranian artifacts abroad

References

6th-century BC works
5th-century BC works
1866 archaeological discoveries
1866 in Egypt
Ancient Egyptian stelas
Achaemenid inscriptions
Archaeology of the Achaemenid Empire
Akkadian inscriptions
Elamite language
Suez Inscriptions
Suez Canal
Archaeological discoveries in Egypt
Wadi Tumilat